Hocomonco Pond is a recreational pond located in Westborough, Massachusetts near Route 9. Also called Hobomoc Pond, it was named for Hobomok, a Wamesit Indian evil spirit. The pond and adjacent land are a Superfund site.

Superfund site
A wood treatment and preservation plant operated on a  site near the pond during the 1930s and 1940s. The business saturated wood products (e.g. telephone poles, railroad ties, pilings and fence posts) with creosote to preserve them. During the treatment process, excess creosote and wastes where discharged to an unlined pit, the "former lagoon". The creosote, which contains carcinogenic polyaromatic hydrocarbon (PAH) compounds, seeped into sediments, soil and groundwater. A storm drain built in the 1970s along the east side of the former lagoon transported liquid contaminants to the pond. The site was added to the National Priorities List on September 8, 1983.

A 1985 Record of Decision specified remedies for cleaning up the site. A landfill for the contaminants was constructed at the former lagoon. The storm drain was relocated. Contaminated soil, waste and sediments were excavated and dredged in operations completed in 1996. The former lagoon area was then capped. The groundwater remains contaminated.

References

EPA Documents & Data

All (4) Five-Year Review Reports

Hocomonco Pond, Westborough MA Site Documents & Data 
 https://cumulis.epa.gov/supercpad/SiteProfiles/index.cfm?fuseaction=second.docdata&id=0100751

External links 
Cleanup Update from the Environmental Protection Agency (1999)

Lakes of Worcester County, Massachusetts
Superfund sites in Massachusetts
Westborough, Massachusetts
Ponds of Massachusetts